Perenniporia piceicola is a species of poroid crust fungus that is found on fallen spruce in Yunnan province, China. Basidiocarps are corky in texture,  or more across with a characteristic pale yellow pore surface. The basidiospores are ellipsoid and hyaline and very large for the genus, up to 13 μm in length.

References

Perenniporia
Fungi described in 2002
Fungi of China
Taxa named by Yu-Cheng Dai